Barbon railway station was located in Westmorland (now part of Cumbria), England, serving the town and locale of Barbon on the Ingleton Branch Line.

History
By the time the branch was completed in 1861, the L&CR was operated by the London and North Western Railway (L&NWR).

After formal closure the line was still on occasions used for weekend excursions and to transport pupils to and from local boarding schools. Goods traffic continued until 1 October 1964. The line was maintained as a possible relief route until April 1967 when the tracks were lifted.

The site is now covered by a housing scheme.

References
Notes

Sources

 Butt, R.V.J. (1995). The Directory Of Railway Stations. Patrick Stephens Limited. .
 Western, Robert (1990). The Ingleton Branch. Oxford : Oakwood Press.

External sources
 Lune Valley Railway

Disused railway stations in Cumbria
Railway stations in Great Britain opened in 1861
Railway stations in Great Britain closed in 1954
Former Lancaster and Carlisle Railway stations
1861 establishments in England